Some Great Videos is the first music video compilation by Depeche Mode, featuring ten music videos directed by Clive Richardson or Peter Care, released in 1985. It coincides with The Singles 81→85.

There are ten videos in the original version, the first video "Just Can't Get Enough", and all videos from "Everything Counts" in 1983 to "It's Called a Heart" in 1985. There's also a bonus live video of "Photographic," and the US release includes the video to "A Question of Lust."

To coincide with the re-release of The Singles 81→85 (1998), Some Great Videos was re-released as Some Great Videos 81>85. The track list is the same as the original UK version, but the artwork is all from the rereleased The Singles 81→85.

Releases

UK 1985 release 
VHS / Betamax: Virgin Video / VVD103

 "Just Can't Get Enough"
 "Everything Counts"
 "Love, in Itself" 
 "People Are People" (12" version) 
 "Master and Servant" 
 "Blasphemous Rumours"
 "Somebody" 
 "Shake the Disease"
 "It's Called a Heart" 
 "Photographic" (live version)

US 1986 releases
VHS: Sire / 38124-3
LD (CLV): Sire / 38124-6

"A Question of Lust"

UK 1998 release
VHS: Mute Film / MF034

 Re-issued as Some Great Videos 81>85 to coincide with the release of The Videos 86>98. Contains the same track listing as the 1985 release.

Notes
All songs were written by Martin Gore, except for "Just Can't Get Enough" and "Photographic" written by Vince Clarke.
Track 4 is the "Different Mix" of the song, although it is written as "People Are People (12" version)" on the artwork.
Though a video for the single version of "People are People" was made, the label decided to use the "Different Mix" of the video. The original video was never released on a public video until the DVD The Best of Depeche Mode Volume 1 in 2006.
"Photographic" is taken from the video The World We Live In and Live in Hamburg, released in the same year.
All videos were directed by Clive Richardson, except for "Shake the Disease" and "It's Called a Heart" directed by Peter Care.
None of the videos by Julien Temple were included in the compilation. Alan Wilder once commented on the videos, when asked about them on his website:
"You can pretty much lump all the Julian Temple videos ("See You", "The Meaning of Love", and "Leave in Silence") into one collective disaster."
Though "Get the Balance Right" was directed by Kevin Hewitt, not Temple, it was not included either as it was not very well liked by the band.

References

External links 
 

Depeche Mode video albums
1985 video albums
Music video compilation albums
1985 compilation albums